Access Microfinance Holding AG, often referred to as AccessHolding, is a commercial microfinance investment and holding company based in Germany. AccessHolding specializes in start-ups and early-stage microfinance institutions (MFIs). It will establish new MFIs together with other partners, and transform existing non-bank microlending institutions into full-service microfinance banks.

Overview
AccessHolding is an investor and technical manager in a network of microfinance banks in developing and emerging countries. These banks specifically target their lending to micro, small and medium-sized enterprises, in the countries that they serve. , the company had eight microfinance banks in Sub-Saharan Africa, Central Asia and the Caucasus. At that time, the group banks' total assets were valued at approximately €1 billion, with shareholders' equity of about €170 million.

History
The company was founded in August 2006 by LFS Financial Systems GmbH (LFS). LFS is a German business and financial consulting firm based in Berlin. It has special expertise in developing and emerging markets. It serves as the manager and technical advisor to the company as well as to the banks in which AccessHolding invests. The company is registered as a "joint stock company" under German law; with a paid-up capital of €27.8 million. , AccessHolding has created a total of eight microfinance banks in Azerbaijan, Madagascar, Tanzania, Nigeria, Liberia, Tajikistan, Zambia, and Rwanda.

AccessBank Group
The member banks of the AccessBank Group include the following:

 AccessBank Azerbaijan - Baku, Azerbaijan  - Total Assets:US$597.4 million (2012) (16.5% shareholding)
 AccessBank Madagascar - Antananarivo, Madagascar  - Total Assets:US$39.1 million (2012) (55.2% shareholding)
 AccessBank Tanzania - Dar es Salaam, Tanzania  - Total Assets:US$55.3 million (2012) (52.7% shareholding)
 AB Microfinance Bank Nigeria - Lagos, Nigeria  - Total Assets:US$42.2 million (2012) (50.1% shareholding) 
 AccessBank Liberia - Monrovia, Liberia  - Total Assets:US$24.3 million (2012) (55.6% shareholding)
 AccessBank Tajikistan - Dushanbe, Tajikistan  - Total Assets:US$23.4 million (2012) (63.4% shareholding)
  AB Bank Zambia - Lusaka, Zambia  - Total Assets:US$8.3 million (2012) (51.0% shareholding)
 AB Bank Rwanda - Kigali, Rwanda  - Total Assets:US$5.54 million (2013) (50.5% shareholding)

Ownership
, the company stock is privately owned by the following corporate entities:

 MicroAssets GbR is the employee investment company owned by the staff of LFS Financial Systems GmbH.

See also
 Development finance institution

External links
 Company Overview At IFC.org
 Website of AccessHolding

References

Companies based in Berlin
Development finance institutions
Holding companies established in 2006